Events in the year 2002 in Cyprus.

Incumbents 

 President: Demetris Christofias
 President of the Parliament: Yiannakis Omirou

Events 
Ongoing – Cyprus dispute

 13 December – The European Union invited the country along with Poland, Hungary, the Czech Republic, Slovakia, Slovenia, Latvia, Estonia, Lithuania, and Malta to join. Expansion is scheduled for May 2004.

Deaths

References 

 
2000s in Cyprus
Years of the 21st century in Cyprus
Cyprus
Cyprus
Cyprus